Yelena Sergeyevna Velikanova (born October 5, 1984, Moscow, RSFSR, USSR) is a Russian theatre, film and voice actress.

Career
In 2001, Yelena entered the Mikhail Shchepkin Higher Theatre School at the State Academic Maly Theater of Russia in Moscow (artistic director of the course   Vitaly Ivanov; teacher   Vladimir Beilis), which she graduated in 2005.

Since 2008 she has been involved in the dubbing of the animated franchise Disney Fairies, being the voice of the fairy Vidia (in the original   Pamela Adlon's voice).

In February 2008, she became the Girl of the Month for the Russian version of MAXIM Magazine.

Selected filmography 
 Popsa (2005) as Slavka
 Vanechka (2007) as Nadya
 The Best Movie (2008) as Nastya Korinovaya
 Jack Ryan: Shadow Recruit (2014) as Katya
 257 Reasons to Live (2020) as Olya

Personal life
Yelena bears the surname of her stepfather, whose great-aunt is the famous Soviet pop singer Gelena Velikanova (1923-1998).

Yelena  has a son   Mikhail (born 2010).

References

External links
 Official website
 

1984 births
Living people
Actresses from Moscow
Russian film actresses
Russian television actresses
Russian stage actresses
21st-century Russian actresses
Russian voice actresses